The 1947–48 Idaho Vandals men's basketball team represented the University of Idaho during the 1947–48 NCAA college basketball season. Members of the Pacific Coast Conference, the Vandals were led by first-year head coach Charles Finley and played their home games on campus at Memorial Gymnasium in Moscow, Idaho.

Finley was hired in the summer of 1947; he was the athletic director and coached two sports at the New Mexico School of Mines in Socorro and was also a baseball scout for the Boston Braves

References

External links
Sports Reference – Idaho Vandals: 1947–48 basketball season
Gem of the Mountains: 1948 University of Idaho yearbook – 1947–48 basketball season
Idaho Argonaut – student newspaper – 1948 editions

Idaho Vandals men's basketball seasons
Idaho
Idaho
Idaho